Lesbian, gay, bisexual, and transgender (LGBT) persons in the Republic of the Congo face legal challenges not experienced by non-LGBT residents. Both male and female same-sex sexual activity is legal in the Republic of the Congo, but same-sex couples and households headed by same-sex couples are not eligible for the same legal protections available to opposite-sex couples, with reports of high level of discrimination and abuses against LGBT people.

Laws regarding same-sex sexual activity
Same-sex relationships have been legal in the Republic of the Congo since 1940. The text of the 1940 Penal Code, as amended in 2006, only prohibits same-sex sexual behaviour with a person younger than 21 years. There is an unequal age of consent, with it being 18 for opposite-sex sexual activity.

Recognition of same-sex relationships
There is no legal recognition of same-sex unions.

Discrimination protections
There is no legal protection against discrimination based on sexual orientation or gender identity.

Living conditions
The U.S. Department of State's 2010 Human Rights Report found that,
There was not a large openly gay or lesbian community due to the social stigma associated with homosexuality ... There were no known cases of violence or discrimination against gays, lesbians, or transgendered individuals during the year. While discrimination may exist due to the social stigma surrounding homosexuality, no such cases were reported to the NGOs or covered by the media.

Summary table

See also

Human rights in the Republic of the Congo
LGBT rights in Africa

References